Todor Hristov, also known as "the Little officer" was a Bulgarian military officer and revolutionary, activist of the Internal Macedonian-Adrianople Revolutionary Organization.

Biography 
Hristov was born on January 20, 1883, in Sofia, Bulgaria. Some sources mistakenly claim that he was born in Veles, then in Ottoman Empire, because his parents were refugees from there. He studied at the Military School in Sofia, graduating in 1902 with the first prize for best achievement. Hristov began service in Fifth Cavalry Regiment in Sofia. In the early spring of 1903 he left the military service and went to Macedonia, joining the Pitu Guli detachment operating in the Krusevo region. At the Smilevo Congress of the Bitola revolutionary district in May 1903, he was elected a member of the Forest Command and military leader of the uprising in Krushevo. During the Ilinden-Preobrazhenie Uprising in the summer of 1903, he was among the leaders of the defense of  Krusevo Republic. At the end of the uprising, he tried to withdraw to Bulgaria together with a group of 18 rebels. They participated on September 21 in a battle near the village of  Biljača, in today's Serbian municipality of Bujanovac. Todor Hristov and 11 other rebels were killed by the Ottomans.

Notes 

People from Sofia
Bulgarian revolutionaries
Members of the Internal Macedonian Revolutionary Organization
Bulgarian military personnel
1883 births
1903 deaths